Mansurabad (also Romanized as Manşūrābād) is a village in Jeyransu Rural District, in the Central District of Maneh and Samalqan County, North Khorasan Province, Iran. At the 2006 census, its population was 13, in 4 families.

References 

Populated places in Maneh and Samalqan County